Gerard Allan Kelly (June 14, 1918 – July 23, 1996) was an American professional basketball player. His career took him to the American Basketball League, Basketball Association of America, and Eastern Professional Basketball League between 1944 and 1949.

BAA career statistics

Regular season

References

External links

1918 births
1996 deaths
American men's basketball players
Boston Celtics players
Guards (basketball)
Marshall Thundering Herd men's basketball players
Paterson Crescents players
Providence Steamrollers players

Basketball players from New York City